The silver cobbler (Neoarius midgleyi), also known as the Lake Argyle catfish, the Lake Argyle silver cobbler, the Midgley's catfish, the Ord River catfish, the shovel-nosed catfish, or the shovelhead catfish, is a species of catfish in the family Ariidae. It was described by Patricia J. Kailola and Bryan E. Pierce in 1988, originally under the genus Arius. It inhabits brackish and freshwaters in northern Australia.

The silver cobbler's diet includes crayfish, finfish and prawns.

References

Ariidae
Fish described in 1988
Freshwater fish of Australia